Gustavia excelsa is a species of woody plant in the family Lecythidaceae. It is found only in Colombia.

References

excelsa
Endangered plants
Endemic flora of Colombia
Taxonomy articles created by Polbot